Rehden–Hamburg gas pipeline (RHG) is a  long branch of MIDAL pipeline with diameter of  to supply Hamburg area with natural gas.  The pipeline was constructed in 1994 by Wingas and E.ON Hanse (Hamburger Gaswerke). It connects to the natural gas storage facility in Rehden.

See also

 WEDAL
 STEGAL
 JAGAL
 NEL pipeline

References

External links
 RHG website by Wingas

Energy infrastructure completed in 1994
Natural gas pipelines in Germany